Lawrence Wright is an author.

Lawrence Wright may also refer to:
 Lawrence Wright (American football) (born 1973), former American football player in the National Football League
 Lawrence Wright (composer) (1888–1964), British popular music composer and publisher
 Lawrence Wright (cricketer) (born 1940), English cricketer
 Lawrence Wright (Royal Navy officer) (died 1713), naval commodore
 Lawrence A. Wright (1927–2000), judge of the United States Tax Court

See also
 Larry Wright (disambiguation)